Fordo Rural District is a rural district (dehestan) in Kahak District, Qom County, Qom Province, Iran. At the 2006 census, its population was 2,265, in 701 families.  The rural district has 8 villages.

References 

Rural Districts of Qom Province
Qom County